"It's a Beautiful Thing", also known as "Love Is a Beautiful Thing", is a country music song co-written by American songwriters Jeffrey Steele and Craig Wiseman. The first version of this song was released on September 14, 1999, by Canadian singer Paul Brandt from his 1999 album That's the Truth, from which it was released as a single in both Canada and the United States. Eight years later, American singer Phil Vassar covered the song under the title "Love Is a Beautiful Thing" on his album Prayer of a Common Man. Vassar's version reached its peak of #2 on the Billboard Hot Country Songs charts in mid-2008.

Content
The song is a moderate up-tempo detailing the various events of a wedding. The verses primarily list actions by the various relatives who have gathered for the event, such as young children horseplaying in the pews, and an aunt who arrived because her "sister's girl" is getting married. In the chorus, the narrator observes that "love is a beautiful thing".

Paul Brandt version
The first version of this song was released as by Canadian singer Paul Brandt under the title "It's a Beautiful Thing". It was included on Brandt's 1999 album That's the Truth, and was his last Top 40 country hit in the United States. It was also a #13 hit for him on the Canadian country charts.

Chart performance

Year-end charts

Phil Vassar version

Phil Vassar covered the song in 2007 under the title of "Love Is a Beautiful Thing". His rendition was the second single released from his 2008 album Prayer of a Common Man. His version includes a few minor lyrical changes, such as "Uncle Joe and Uncle Jake / Haven't spoken since '98", instead of "…haven't spoken since '88." Also, while Brandt's version ends in a fade-out, with him still singing, Vassar's version ends with a cold piano outro.

Chart performance

Year-end charts

Music video
The music video for Vassar's version features scenes of him playing a piano in front of various wedding pictures. This video was directed by Peter Zavadil.

External links
Phil Vassar music video at YouTube

References

1999 singles
2007 singles
Country ballads
2000s ballads
Phil Vassar songs
Songs written by Jeffrey Steele
Songs written by Craig Wiseman
Music videos directed by Peter Zavadil
Paul Brandt songs
Show Dog-Universal Music singles
Reprise Records singles
Song recordings produced by Mark Wright (record producer)
Song recordings produced by Chris Farren (country musician)
1999 songs
Songs about marriage